Among those who were born in the London Borough of Lambeth, or have dwelt within the borders of the modern borough are (alphabetical order by surname):

Tony Abbott, Prime Minister of Australia, born in Lambeth in 1957
Naveen Andrews, actor, born in Lambeth in 1969
Muriel Angelus, actress, born Lambeth, 1912–2004
Elias Ashmole, alchemist, died in Lambeth in 1692
Winifred Barnes (1892–1935), musical theatre comedy actress and singer, born in Brixton
William Blake, religious visionary, poet and artist
Daniel Bott, Mayor of Strathfield, born in Lambeth
David Bowie, singer, songwriter, multi-instrumentalist, record producer, arranger, and actor
Ben Bryant, cricketer
Henry Burton, cricketer, born in Lambeth in 1874
Shane Byrne, 6-time British Superbike champion
 Kevin Campbell (footballer), born in Lambeth
Jamal Campbell-Ryce, professional footballer for Carlisle United FC, born in Lambeth
Phoebe Carlo (1874–1898), actress, born in Lambeth 
Charlie Chaplin, film actor and comedian, spent his early life in Lambeth
Joy Crookes, singer-songwriter, born in Lambeth
Helen Hoppner Coode, Punchs first woman cartoonist
John Doulton and Sir Henry Doulton, founded pottery company Royal Doulton in Lambeth
John Dimmer, lieutenant colonel, recipient of the Victoria cross in 1914.
Aubrey Fair, footballer who played mainly as a left-back for West Ham United
Kieran Gibbs, professional footballer, currently playing for Inter Miami, born in Lambeth
Christopher Newman Hall, founded the Christ Church complex in Lambeth of which only the Lincoln Memorial Tower survives today
Ken Livingstone, former London Mayor, born in Lambeth in 1945
Rob Lord, composer of music for films, TV and computer games
Archie Madekwe, actor; born in Lambeth
Geoff Marshall, video producer and presenter; born in Lambeth
W. Somerset Maugham, completed his training in obstetrics in Lambeth and used that experience as the basis for his novel Liza of Lambeth
Stella McCartney, English fashion designer
Elliot Rodger, perpetrator of the 2014 Isla Vista killings, born in Lambeth in 1991
Carl McCoy, frontman for gothic rock band Fields of the Nephilim, born there in 1963
F. B. Meyer, pastored Christ Church in Lambeth
William Chester Minor, major contributor to the Oxford English Dictionary; while living at Lambeth, he murdered George Merrett, for which crime he was found criminally insane and confined for the rest of his life at Broadmoor.
John Nash, architect and urbanist, born in Lambeth in 1752
Akai Osei, street dancer; winner of Got To Dance; born in Lambeth
Scott Parker, manager of Fulham F.C, born in Lambeth
Conrad Phillips, actor (1925–2016)
Shirley Pitts (1934–1992), English fraudster and thief, the "queen of shoplifters", born on the Lambeth Walk
Guy Pratt, bass guitarist, born in Lambeth
Frederick Ruffell (born 1997), cricketer
Tony Selby (1938–2021), actor played Corporal Marsh in the comedy series Get Some In (ITV 1975 to 1978); starred in Eastenders; Dr. Who, The Good Life, and Bless This House.
Katie Seymour, Gaiety Theatre dancer, Lambeth resident
Charlie Smirke, Derby-winning jockey, born in Lambeth
James Stephen, undersecretary of state for the colonies (1836–1847) 
Sir Arthur Sullivan, composer of the Gilbert and Sullivan operas, born in Lambeth in 1842
Edward Thomas, poet, born in Lambeth
 Michael Thomas (footballer, born 1967), born in Lambeth
Arthur Tooth, ritualist clergyman in the Church of England, curate of St. Mary's Lambeth in 1863
Harriet Vernon, music hall performer and principal boy; born in Lambeth in 1858
Peter Whittle (born 1961), politician, author, journalist and broadcaster, born in Lambeth
 Tim Murtagh (born 1981), international cricketer who has played for the Ireland national cricket team, Middlesex County Cricket Club, Surrey County Cricket Club and the Reigate Priory Llamas in the Surrey Championship
 Chris Murtagh (born 1984) cricketer who has played for Surrey County Cricket Club, the Reigate Priory Llamas and Shropshire County Cricket Club
 Loyle Carner (born 1994), musician
 Karamoko Dembele (born 2003), footballer
 Carl Wheatle (born 1998), basketball player

References

Lambeth
People from the London Borough of Lambeth